The Leger Pataplume 1 is a French amateur-built aircraft, designed by Leger Aviation of Archiac and made available in the form of plans for amateur construction. The aircraft's design goals are simplicity and economy of construction with low operating costs.

When it was available the aircraft was marketed with the French slogan "simplicite, economie, amusement".

By 2013 the company website had been removed and the plans were apparently no longer available.

Design and development
The Pataplume 1 features a strut-braced mid-wing, a two-seats-in-tandem open cockpit with a windshield, fixed conventional landing gear and a single engine in tractor configuration.

The aircraft is made from wood and finished with doped aircraft fabric. The recommended engine is a  1600 cc Volkswagen air-cooled engine four-stroke powerplant.

While there were no kits supplied for the design, Leger Aviation did supply all needed raw materials.

Specifications (Pataplume 1)

References

External links

Website archives on Archive.org

Homebuilt aircraft
Single-engined tractor aircraft
Leger Aviation aircraft